is a 1921 Japanese silent film directed by Minoru Murata. Film critic Mark Cousins wrote that it was "the first landmark film in Japanese history".

See also
 Cinema of Japan

References

Further reading

External links
 

1921 films
Japanese silent films
Japanese black-and-white films